Chalo Dilli  is a 2011 Indian film directed by Shashant Shah. It features Lara Dutta and Vinay Pathak. It also features Akshay Kumar and Mahika Sharma in a guest appearance. The film, produced under Dutta's husband Mahesh Bhupathi's production company, Big Daddy Productions and Eros International Media Ltd, was shot at locations in Mumbai, Delhi and Jaipur. It was released on 29 April 2011. It was inspired by the film Planes, Trains and Automobiles starring Steve Martin. A sequel to the film, named Chalo China, was set to be made in 2014 but was postponed due to lack of financers.

Plot

Mihika Banerjee (Lara Dutta), a successful investment banker living in Mumbai, misses her flight to Delhi and needs to get there any way possible to meet her husband, Lt. Col. Vikram Rana (Akshay Kumar). She meets Manu Gupta (Vinay Pathak) and they discover the colours of India in their journey to Delhi. They go by road and train and the audience gets a chance to see both the large urban conglomerations and the small rural areas like Nua, a small town in Rajasthan, that make up India. During the journey, Mihika experiences various difficulties which she has never encountered in her high class life. When Mihika's money is stolen while she is buying a train ticket, she is forced to travel with Manu in the ordinary class in Jhunjhunu District. Thus the film revolves around Mihika's and Manu's journey amidst difficulties.

Cast
 Lara Dutta as Mihika Banerjee / Mihika Vikram Singh Rana
 Vinay Pathak as Manu Gupta
 Akshay Kumar as Lt. Col. Vikram Singh Rana, Mihika's husband (Cameo appearance)
 Anil Marwari as Taxi Boy 
 Pankaj Jha as Inspector Surendra Mishra
 Brijendra Kala as K. C. Pant (train ticket examiner)
 Rahul Singh (actor) as Bhairon Singh Gurjar
 Mahika Sharma as Aalisha
 Raghav Tiwari as Naresh
 Lokesh Verma as Billu
 Ajit Mathur as Pappu 
 Gaurav Gera as Gopi
 Mukesh Bhatt (actor) as Pandeyji
 Teddy Maurya as Bhaiyaji/Shrivastava Ji
 Manoj Bakshi as Jhujjhar Singh
 Narottam Bain as Shivratan/Bablu (taxi driver)
Dadhi R Pandey as Dharampalji (lorry driver)
 Yana Gupta as Laila (guest appearance in the song "Laila O Laila")

Critical reception
The film received mixed reviews, and was given 3.5/5 stars by The Times of India, 2.5/5 stars by IndiaWeekly and 1.5/5 by rediff.com.

Soundtrack

The music was composed by Gourov Dasgupta, Anand Raj Anand, Sachin Gupta, Rohit Kulkarni, and Roshan Balu. Lyrics were penned by Manthan, Anand Raj Anand, Krishika Lulla, Shabbir Ahmed, and Nisha Mascarenhas. A remix version of the track "Laila O Laila" from the 1980 film Qurbani, is used in the film and features Yana Gupta.

Track listing

References

External links
 
 
 

2010s Hindi-language films
Indian road movies
2011 films
2010s road movies
Films scored by Anand Raj Anand